James Leonard McIntire (born April 9, 1953) is an American economist and politician who served as the 22nd Washington State Treasurer from 2008 to 2017. A member of the Democratic Party, he previously served as a member of the Washington State House of Representatives, representing the 46th district from 1998 to 2009.

Early life, education and early career

Born in Bluffton, Ohio, McIntire attended Macalester College, graduating with his Bachelor of Arts in urban and regional affairs, in 1976. He received his Master of Arts in public policy from the University of Michigan, in 1978. McIntire also later attended the University of Washington, receiving his Ph.D. in economics, in 1993.

McIntire started his career working as an economist for the United States Congress Joint Economic Committee, from 1977 to 1980, for former Vice President and then Senator Hubert Humphrey. From 1980 to 1981, he worked as an economist for the United States Senate Committee on Health, Education, Labor, and Pensions, before briefly working as a special legislative assistant for California Congressman Augustus F. Hawkins, in 1981. McIntire was hired as a research scientist for the Battelle Human Affairs Research Center in 1983, before reentering politics; working as a special assistant for fiscal policy for former Washington governor Booth Gardner, from 1985 to 1987. He joined the University of Washington, as a senior lecturer at the Daniel J. Evans School of Public Affairs in 1987, and is still currently a professor at the university. From 1990 to 1996, McIntitre served on the board of directors and as the chairman of Common Cause, a nonprofit housing development foundation; in 1993 he was appointed director of the Fiscal Policy Center at the University of Washington, and was appointed to serve as  chairman of the Washington Community Economic Revitalization Board in 1994, holding both positions until 1998.

Washington House of Representatives

Elections
McIntire served five terms in the Washington House of Representatives, representing Washington's 46th legislative district from 1998 to 2009. After Governor Gary Locke appointed incumbent Democratic state representative Marlin J. Appelwick to serve on the Washington Court of Appeals in 1998, McIntire ran for the open seat. He defeated Republican Nick Slepko and Reform Party candidate A.J. Skurdal; receiving 77% of the vote. In 2000, he defeated Libertarian John Sample, and was uncontested in the general in 2002. McIntire continued to win reelection in 2004, and 2006.

Committees

During his tenure in the Washington House McIntire served on the House Economic and Revenue Forecast Council, and the House Caseload Forecast Council. McIntire also served on the committees for:

 Finance (Chairman)
 Legislative Evaluation and Accountability Program
 Joint Administrative Rules Review
 Capital Budget
 Financial Institutions, Housing & Insurance
 Appropriations

Washington State Treasurer

McIntire ran for the Democratic nomination for State Treasurer of Washington, after 14-year incumbent Mike Murphy retired. He ran against Republican Assistant Washington State Treasurer, Allan Martin in the general election. Martin significantly outspent McIntire by a two-to-one margin during the campaign, and saw key endorsements from outgoing State Treasurer Mike Murphy, and the Seattle Times. However, on November 4, 2008, McIntire defeated Martin in the general election with 51.08% of the vote.

In 2012, McIntire ran for reelection against Republican Sharon Hanek, a self-employed accountant. Hanek, who failed to get on the ballot officially as a Republican, ran as a write-in candidate. On November 6, 2012, McIntire won in the general election, receiving 58% of the vote, to Hanke's 41%.

Electoral history

References

External links

1953 births
21st-century American politicians
Living people
Democratic Party members of the Washington House of Representatives
People from Bluffton, Ohio
State treasurers of Washington (state)
Gerald R. Ford School of Public Policy alumni
Macalester College alumni
American economists
University of Washington College of Arts and Sciences alumni